Universitatea Cluj-Napoca may refer to:
Babeș-Bolyai University, an education institution from Cluj-Napoca
FC Universitatea Cluj, a sports club from Cluj-Napoca